Ilias Iliadis may refer to:

 Ilias Iliadis (judoka), Georgian-born Greek judoka
 Ilias Iliadis (footballer), Greek-Canadian footballer